The Tap Dance Kid is a musical based on the novel Nobody's Family is Going to Change by Louise Fitzhugh. It was written by Charles Blackwell with music by Henry Krieger and lyrics by Robert Lorick.

Synopsis

Act I

William Sheridan, a successful attorney, lives on Roosevelt Island with his wife Ginnie and their two children: 14-year-old Emma, an outspoken, independent-minded, and overweight girl who wants to be a lawyer more than anything, and 10-year-old Willie, whom William wants to follow in his footsteps. However all Willie wants is to be a tap dancer. The show opens on a typical morning with Ginnie preparing breakfast and preparing for the day and Emma and Willie arguing ("Another Day"). Later that day, Emma returns home from school, angry at her parents and the world for underestimating and mistreating her ("Four Strikes Against Me"). Ginnie's brother Dipsey Bates arrives for Willie's tap lesson. The kids urge him to tell stories about the old days when Ginnie, Dipsey and their late father Daddy Bates performed as a vaudeville trio ("Class Act"). The number ends as William returns home from work. Finding his study in disarray. He coolly greets Dipsey, for whom he has little use as a 33-year-old  dancer. Dipsey exits, leaving William to examine the children's report cards. He pays scant attention to Emma's exceptional grades, but he is so disappointed by Willie's poor grades that he grounds him and forbids him from dancing. 

Three weeks later, Willie still is not been allowed to dance. He goes to the playground where he is made taunted for dancing by Winslow, a local teenage bully. Emma arrives and defends Willie against Winslow, but she still admonishes him for dancing. Emma and Willie fight and complain about their parents before Emma leaves ("They Never Hear What I Say"). Willie expresses to Emma what dancing means to him ("Dancing is Everything"). Willie runs away to Manhattan in search of Dipsey ("Crosstown").

Dipsey is rehearsing his dancers for an industrial show for a shoe buyers' convention. The performance has been designed to showcase Dipsey's dancing and choreographic talents with which he hopes to impress the producers of an out-of-town Broadway tryout ("Fabulous Feet"). Willie arrives during the rehearsal and is uncontrollably drawn into the number, dancing with his uncle. The dancers are so amazed by Willie that they stop dancing and just let him perform. Excited by his nephew's potential, Dipsey rushes the boy home to tell his parents the good news. Dipsey's assistant Carole is left to continue the rehearsal. After the rehearsal, she reflects on her emotions for Dipsey ("I Could Get Used to Him").

Dipsey brings Willie back home and excitedly tells Ginnie and William of Willie's raw talent. William interrupts, furious because Willie ran away and risked his life by going alone to New York City. Sensing his authority slipping away due to Ginnie and Emma's protests, William lashes out and forbids Willie from tap dancing and seeing Dipsey. Willie, heartbroken, runs out onto the terrace, and Dipsey follows him and comforts him, telling him he'll have to dance inside of himself ("Man on the Moon").

Act II

Willie has not danced for weeks and is miserable. During another breakfast in the Sheridan household, an argument ensues, and William storms out. Emma accuses her mother of not asserting herself nor caring enough about her children. Ginnie accuses Emma of being exactly like her father. They fight ("Like Him"). Dipsey and Carole, now dating and living together, wait in their loft to find out if Dipsey booked the out-of-town tryout in Buffalo, New York. Dipsey has just given up hope when the phone rings telling him he got the job. Dipsey and Carole celebrate, with Dipsey finally succeeding in life ("My Luck Is Changing"). 

Willie has gone to the playground to be alone, and Emma comes looking for him. This time instead of arguing, they connect and dream about a day they are understood by their parents ("Someday").

Ginnie comes to Dipsey's loft, confused and upset, not knowing how to cheer up Willie. Dipsey tries to convince her to let Willie try out for a role in his new Buffalo show. Ginnie, knowing what the consequences might be, refuses. Echoing Emma's earlier sentiments, Dipsey accuses Ginnie of caring only about keeping her husband happy. Ginnie explains to Dipsey that William was not always like this, and that there is still good inside of him ("I Remember How It Was"). She goes to Willie's bedroom and warily tells him about his audition the next day for Dipsey's show. Willie is overjoyed. Ginnie tucks him in for the night and sings to her son until he falls asleep ("Lullabye"). 

Willie dreams a wonderful dream starring his grandfather, wherein the following day, Willie auditions for the show. The bug of finally being on a stage propels Willie into a fantasy in which he is surrounded by all of Willie's idols, the great dancers Fred Astaire, Bojangles, Gene Kelly, The Nicholas Brothers, Dipsey and Daddy Bates. They dance with him in his dream ("Dance If It Makes You Happy").

Willie auditions the next day and receives the part. Without celebration, Ginnie takes him and Emma to Dipsey and Carole's house to wait for william and prepare for his reaction to the news. William arrives, and when Ginnie tells him the news, he is outraged. The family is speechless and nervously cowers in front of William before Emma stands up to him. Her speech, coupling the courtroom savvy of a seasoned professional with the vulnerability of a hurt child, is a powerful indictment against William for alienation of affection and loss of aid to dependent children. Ginnie tells William that things cannot continue this way. She demands that she should be just as in charge of the family as he is. William explodes and in a frightening display, pours out his deep-rooted anguish and self-hatred to the family ("William's Song"). 

Later, alone in front of Dipsey's building, William waits, not knowing what will happen. Emma joins him, and she and her father finally reach an understanding. Willie arrives and tells William that he is not taking the part in the show but still longs to be a dancer. Ginnie appears, followed by Dipsey, and they both make peace with William. They all compromise a little, but they will still remain together as a family ("Class Act [Finale]").

Musical numbers

Original Broadway Production

Act I      
Another Day — Ginnie, Emma and Willie
Four Strikes Against Me  — Emma 
Class Act  — Ginnie, Dipsey and Daddy Bates 
They Never Hear What I Say  — Emma and Willie 
Dancing Is Everything  — Willie 
Crosstown  — Willie and New Yorkers 
Fabulous Feet  — Dipsey, Carole and Dancers 
I Could Get Used to Him  — Carole
Man in the Moon  — Dipsey

Act II      
Like Him — Ginnie and Emma 
My Luck Is Changing  — Dipsey 
I Remember How It Was  — Ginnie 
Someday  — Emma and Willie 
Lullabye  — Ginnie 
Tap Tap  — Daddy Bates, Willie and Dipsey 
Dance if It Makes You Happy  — Willie, Dipsey, Daddy Bates, Carole and Dancers 
William's Song  — William 
Class Act (Finale)  — Willie, Emma, Ginnie, William, Dipsey

National Tour

Act I      
Dipsey's Coming Over - Willie
High Heels - Dipsey, Carole, Dancers
Something Better, Something More - Dipsey
Four Strikes Against Me  — Emma 
Class Act  — Ginnie, Dipsey and Daddy Bates 
They Never Hear What I Say  — Emma and Willie 
Dancing Is Everything  — Willie 
Crosstown  — Willie and New Yorkers 
Fabulous Feet  — Dipsey, Carole and Dancers 
I Could Get Used to Him  — Carole
Man in the Moon  — Dipsey

Act II      
Like Him — Ginnie and Emma 
My Luck Is Changing  — Dipsey 
I Remember How It Was  — Ginnie 
Someday  — Emma and Willie 
Lullabye  — Ginnie 
Tap Tap  — Daddy Bates, Willie and Dipsey 
Dance if It Makes You Happy  — Willie, Dipsey, Daddy Bates, Carole and Dancers 
William's Song  — William 
Class Act (Finale)  — Willie, Emma, Ginnie, William, Dipsey

Note: Most productions following the National Tour, including the Encores! production, follow the same tracklist as the National Tour production.

Notable principal casts

Productions
The musical opened on Broadway on December 21, 1983, at the Broadhurst Theatre and ran until March 11, 1984. On March 27, 1984, it resumed performances at the Minskoff Theatre, closing on August 11, 1985, for a total run of 669 performances.
Directed by Vivian Matalon with musical staging and dances by Danny Daniels, it featured Hinton Battle, Samuel E. Wright, Hattie Winston, Martine Allard, and Alfonso Ribeiro as Willie.  In 1984 Ribeiro's 10-year-old understudy, Savion Glover, took over the title role.

The reviews were mixed. Frank Rich, in his review for The New York Times praised the choreography and many actors' performances but saw the plot as "earnest [but] plodding" and the music forgettable.

A production directed by Jerry Zaks with choreography by Danny Daniels ran at the Pantages Theatre, Los Angeles, California, in September 1985 as part of a tour. This production also ran in Miami Beach, Florida in April 1986 and Chicago, Illinois in May 1986.

As part of its "Encores!" program, New York City Center mounted a production running February 2-6, 2022. Lydia Diamond wrote the concert adaptation. Kenny Leon directed, with choreography by Jared Grimes.

Awards and nominations

Original Broadway production

References

External links

'The Tap Dance Kid' synopsis, song list and production at guidetomusicaltheatre.com

1983 musicals
Broadway musicals
Musicals based on novels
Tony Award-winning musicals